Mario Hieblinger (born 5 July 1977) is an Austrian football player who is currently under contract with Austrian amateur club Union Neuhofen an der Krems as both player and manager. He plays as a defender.

Club career
Born in Mistelbach, Lower Austria, Hieblinger began his football career at SV Stockerau. His first professional contract was signed with VfB Admira Wacker Mödling, from where he moved to SV Austria Salzburg. After receiving limited playing time, he moved to the former Salzburg satellite club BSV Bad Bleiberg in the Austrian Football second division. After good performances, Hieblinger moved to FC Kärnten in the Austrian Bundesliga. While at Klagenfurt, Hieblinger became an international for Austria. Following FC Kärnten's relegation in 2004, he stayed with the Carinthians for one more year.

In the summer of 2005, Hieblinger was brought by Walter Schachner as a replacement for Mario Tokić to Grazer AK, but failed to meet high expectations. Therefore, during the summer transfer window of 2006, Hieblinger moved to newly promoted Greek club Ergotelis in the Greek Superleague. During his time with Ergotelis, Hieblinger developed into a key player and one of the captains of the Cretans, and was considered among the best defenders in the league. In 2011, Hieblinger extended his contract with the club until June 2013. He made 149 league appearances for Ergotelis during a six-year span, all in the Greek Superleague, which makes him the player with the most caps in top-flight for the Cretan club (and third overall in professional league appearances, tied with former teammate Diego Romano).

In the summer of 2012, following Ergotelis' relegation to the Football League, Hieblinger moved back home to LASK Linz.

Career statistics

International career
Hieblinger made his debut for Austria on 22 March 2003 in a friendly match against Greece, which ended 2-2. He continued to receive caps for the national team under coach Hans Krankl even as a second division player. His last international game came during his time with GAK in September 2005, where he featured in a World Cup qualification match against Azerbaijan, which ended 0−0. In total, Hieblinger earned 13 caps for Austria.

National team statistics

External links
Player profile – Ergotelis 

 

1977 births
Living people
People from Mistelbach
Association football defenders
Austrian footballers
Austria international footballers
Austrian expatriate footballers
FC Admira Wacker Mödling players
SV Stockerau players
FC Red Bull Salzburg players
FC Kärnten players
Grazer AK players
Ergotelis F.C. players
LASK players
Austrian Football Bundesliga players
Super League Greece players
Expatriate footballers in Greece
Footballers from Lower Austria